Clement  may refer to:

People
 Clements (surname)

Places
 Clements, California, U.S.
 Clements, Kansas, U.S.
 Clements, Maryland, U.S.
 Clements, Minnesota, U.S.
 Clements, West Virginia, U.S.
 Port Clements, British Columbia, Canada

Zoology 

 The Clements Checklist of Birds of the World

See also

 Clement (disambiguation)
 St Clements (disambiguation)
 Clements High School
 Clemence, a name